Wisdom of the Gnomes (literally "Call of the gnomes") is an animated series produced by Spanish company BRB Internacional and Televisión Española about Gnomes. It was a spin-off of the series The World of David the Gnome. It was based on the books The Secret Book of Gnomes by Wil Huygen.

Other sequels, both in serial and movie form, were The Great Adventure of the Gnomes (1995), The Gnomes in the Snow (1999) and The Fantastic Adventures of the Gnomes (2000).

Plot 
In this series the protagonist is a gnome called Klaus, a judge (aka "wise man Klaus"), who travels with his assistant Danny on Henry the Swan, trying to solve disputes and lawsuits between animals peacefully and wisely.

Like in The World of David the Gnome, the trolls also appear in this series. David himself appears in one episode.

The penultimate episode features Wil Huygen and his wife, the only pair of humans in direct communication with Gnomes. Klaus and Danny complain to Huygen of "inaccuracies" in his book, though what these errors are is not made specific.

Cast

English dub crew 
 Robert Axelrod - Adaptation
 Richard Epcar - Adaptation
 Melora Harte - Adaptation
 Dave Mallow - Adaptation, Director
 Doug Stone - Adaptation, Director

Episodes 
 Klaus the Judge (27 September 1989)
 Loch Ness (4 October 1989)
 Trip to Canada (11 October 1989)
 The Magic Carpet (18 October 1989)
 The Chamois (25 October 1989)
 Trip to Nepal (1 November 1989)
 The Gold-Diggers (8 November 1989)
 Adventure in the Arctic (15 November 1989)
 The Discovery of Ithaca (22 November 1989)
 The Carpathians (29 November 1989)
 Trip to Venice (6 December 1989)
 The Ballad of Gnomoshima (13 December 1989)
 The Gnome-Olympics (20 December 1989)
 Trip to Siberia (10 June 1993)
 Andalusia (17 June 1993)
 China (24 June 1993)
 France (1 July 1993)
 Hawaii (8 July 1993)
 The Stolen Mirror (15 July 1993)
 The Winter Race (22 July 1993)
 Mystery in the Forest (29 July 1993)
 The Gnomewegians (5 August 1993)
 Argentina (12 August 1993)
 Dany's Wedding (19 August 1993)
 Holland (26 August 1993)
 Goodbye Klaus (2 September 1993)

References

External links 
 

1987 Spanish television series debuts
1988 Spanish television series endings
1980s Spanish television series
1980s animated television series
Television shows based on children's books
Spanish children's animated adventure television series
RTVE shows
ITV children's television shows
Fictional gnomes
Animated television series spinoffs